Michael Frost (born 29 May 2001) is a South African cricketer. Frost holds an Irish passport, and in February 2020, he was added to the Ireland Wolves team for their tour to Namibia. He made his List A debut on 27 February 2020, for Ireland Wolves against Namibia, during their tour to South Africa. In June 2021, Frost was selected to play for Munster Reds in the 2021 Inter-Provincial Trophy. He made his Twenty20 debut on 18 June 2021, for Munster Reds in the 2021 Inter-Provincial Trophy.

In May 2022, in the 2022 Inter-Provincial Cup, Frost took his first five-wicket haul in List A cricket, with 5/42 against North West Warriors.

References

External links
 

2001 births
Living people
Irish cricketers
South African cricketers
Munster Reds cricketers
Place of birth missing (living people)